Tissahamia is a genus of southeast Asian cellar spiders named after Wanniyalaeto chief Uru Warige Tissahami. It was erected in 20180 for several species transferred from Pholcus after a molecular phylogenetic study of the Calapnita-Panjange clade of Pholcidae. They have long, thin abdomens that bend upward near the end. They also have six eyes, three on each of two eye stalks.

Species
 it contains twelve species:
T. barisan (Huber, 2016) – Indonesia (Sumatra)
T. bukittimah (Huber, 2016) – Singapore
T. ethagala (Huber, 2011) (type) – Sri Lanka
T. gombak (Huber, 2011) – Malaysia
T. karuna Huber, 2019 – Sri Lanka
T. kottawagamaensis (Yao & Li, 2016) – Sri Lanka
T. ledang (Huber, 2011) – Malaysia
T. maturata (Huber, 2011) – Sri Lanka
T. phui (Huber, 2011) – Thailand
T. tanahrata (Huber, 2016) – Malaysia
T. uludong (Huber, 2016) – Malaysia
T. vescula (Simon, 1901) – Malaysia

See also
 Pholcus
 List of Pholcidae species

References

Further reading

Pholcidae genera
Spiders of Asia